The Gormogon is a fictional character featured in a story arc of Season 3 of the Fox drama Bones.

Background and development
The Gormogon was introduced as a cannibalistic serial killer in the third-season premiere, "The Widow's Son in the Windshield", and has made appearances in the form of teeth marks on bones examined by the Jeffersonian scientists. He makes his first on-screen appearance in "The Knight on the Grid" (episode 8), although his former master, Arthur Graves, appears earlier in that episode, and his late apprentice, Jason Harkness (Andrew James Allen), appeared in the season premiere. Before the season finale "The Pain in the Heart", reviewers and fans speculated that the audience has actually already met him, perhaps being psychologist Dr. Lance Sweets.

This belief was partially validated later in the season when the show's executive producer, Hart Hanson, stated in an interview with EW.com that either the Gormogon or his apprentice is someone the fans are fond of.  In the season finale, this statement is confirmed when Dr. Brennan finds that Zack Addy had lied about some of his earlier conclusions, leading Dr. Brennan and Agent Seeley Booth to realize that Zack must be the apprentice.  The team finally tracks down the Gormogon with the information provided by Zack as to the location of the Gormogon's home, and Booth kills him; he has not been given a name, and he has been described by Sweets as "a nobody, an invisible man, angry at history for not seeing him". The stunt performer — Laurence Todd Rosenthal — who played the current (and presumably last) Gormogon, went uncredited; the character had no spoken dialogue and appeared on screen only briefly.

Modus operandi
When particles left on a victim's skull led Dr. Temperance Brennan and Seeley Booth to a vault in an old bank, they discover tapestries, paintings, books, and other artifacts related to a number of mystical orders and traditions, including Kabbalah, Freemasonry, and Gnosticism. One of these tapestries included the imagery of the wolf, a symbol of freedom and power, which reflected in the killer's dentures, which were made exclusively with real canine teeth only (canines being symbolic of the wolf). The key feature of the vault is a silver skeleton arranged in a "widow's son" pose, a position known to the ancient Greeks as one of sacrifice. Parts of the silver skeleton had been replaced with actual bone, which bear teeth marks from two different individuals, suggesting ritualistic consumption of flesh. The vault also yields a tapestry whose pattern corresponds to specific locations in Washington, D.C. and to tarot cards showing different archetypes, such as the Musician, the Bishop, and the Corruptor. The map provides a schematic for the Gormogon's activities, including the atomic location of the sculpture and of another, older sculpture and the residence of the Gormogon's old master, and the order of archetypes which are being integrated, via their bones, into the sculpture.

Inspiration
The Gormogons were an anti-Masonic order of the 18th century. They are mentioned in scattered writings of the era, and accusations of association with them may have been used as a political weapon, as the very existence of the order involved a rejection of Masonic ideas. However, only the name has any relevance on the show, as Hodgins borrows it to refer to the killer for his dual reverence for and apparent dislike of secret societies and fraternal orders, including the Knights of Columbus. Hodgins' and Sweets' understanding of typical practices among orders, such as the master-apprentice relationship, ritualistic meals, and sacred geometry inform the ongoing investigation of the murders.

Known victims
Two skeleton sculptures have been found, one of which was constructed by Arthur Graves and the current Gormogon, the other by Jason Harkness and the current Gormogon. The former was completely made of bone, while the latter was still mostly silver. Not all the victims have yet been identified, but at least one bone in each sculpture was added for its significance to its owner. The three victims named below all lost their fathers at young ages, making them "widows' sons" and thus doubly symbolic as a sacrifice to the Gormogon. They were all involved with a trip to the Anatolian region of Turkey, and associated with the Knights of Columbus.
 Gavin Nichols, a violinist. His little finger, essential for his art, is added to the silver skeleton, and he corresponds to the Musician tarot card on the Gormogon's schematic.
 Father Douglas Cooper, a bishop. His kneecaps, essential in prayer, are added (by Brennan) to the silver skeleton, and he corresponds to the Bishop tarot card on the Gormogon's schematic.
 Mr. Porter, a lobbyist. As would be expected judging by his profession, his mandible, being a component associated with speech, is sent to Brennan. He corresponds to the Corruptor tarot card on the Gormogon's schematic.  When Dr. Addy is revealed as the current apprentice of the Gormogon, it is established that he had killed Porter.  Later on in the fourth season, it is revealed that Zack is, in fact, not the original killer, but an "accessory" to the killing. Porter's actual killer is the Gormogon's second apprentice, who the Gormogon had killed before recruiting Zack, contrary to Zack admitting to the murder in the season 3 finale. In season 12's "The Day in the Life", Zack is exonerated for his murder by the Jeffersonian team.
 The Apprentice, the Gormogon's apprentice before Zack. Murdered by the Gormogon to make way for Zack to take his place as "there can only ever be two." His body was eventually located in "The Steal in the Wheels" and used to exonerate Zack for the murder of Mr. Porter.
 An unnamed SWAT officer, potentially. When Booth and SWAT stormed the Gormogon's home, he threw a knife into the officer's chest, apparently killing (or at least wounding) him.
 An unknown victim. When Booth and SWAT stormed the Gormogon's home, he was seen eating a piece of meat, which was most likely human. Zack told them that if they smelled meat cooking, it would mean the Gormogon had claimed another victim. The identity of this person has not been revealed.

Related episodes
 3.01 – "The Widow's Son in the Windshield"
 3.04 - "The Secret in the Soil" (Hodgins mentions 'German guy' responsible for 'Widow's Son killings' and Zack asks for more details)
 3.06 – "Intern in the Incinerator" (mentioned as suspect, not responsible for killings)
 3.08 – "The Knight on the Grid"
 3.15 – "The Pain in the Heart"
 4.05 – "The Perfect Pieces in the Purple Pond"
 4.14 - "The Hero in the Hold"
 12.06 – "The Flaw in the Saw" (photo of crime scene of Ray Porter's murder)
 12.09 – "The Steal in the Wheels" (The Apprentice's remains)

References

Fictional serial killers
Gormogon, The
Fictional cannibals
Television characters introduced in 2007
Male characters in television